The province of the Bangka–Belitung Islands in Indonesia is divided into kabupaten or regencies which in turn are divided administratively into districts, known as kecamatan.

The districts of the Bangka–Belitung Islands with the regency it falls into are as follows:

Air Gegas, South Bangka
Badau, Belitung
Bakam, Bangka
Batu Betumpang, South Bangka
Belinyu, Bangka
Bukit Intan, Pangkal Pinang
Dendang, East Belitung
Gantung, East Belitung
Gerunggang, Pangkal Pinang
Jebus, West Bangka
Kelapa Kampit, East Belitung
Kelapa, West Bangka
Koba, Central Bangka
Lepar Pongok, South Bangka
Lubuk, Central Bangka
Manggar, East Belitung
Membalong, Belitung
Mendo Barat, Bangka
Mentok, West Bangka
Merawang, Bangka
Namang, Central Bangka
Pangkal Balam, Pangkal Pinang
Pangkalan Baru, Central Bangka
Payung, South Bangka
Pemali, Bangka
Puding Besar, Bangka
Rangkui, Pangkal Pinang
Riau Silip, Bangka
Selat Nasik, Belitung
Sijuk, Belitung
Simpang Katis, Central Bangka
Simpang Rimba, South Bangka
Simpang Teritip, West Bangka
Sungai Liat, Bangka
Sungai Selan, Central Bangka
Taman Sari, Pangkal Pinang
Tanjung Pandan, Belitung
Tempilang, West Bangka
Toboali, South Bangka
Tukak Sadai, South Bangka

 
Bangka Belitung